My Pal Wolf is a 1944 American drama film directed by Alfred L. Werker from a screenplay by Lillie Hayward, Leonard Praskins and John Paxton based on a story by Frederick Hazlitt Brennan. Produced and distributed by RKO Radio Pictures, the film was released on October 8, 1944. The film stars Sharyn Moffett (in her film debut), Jill Esmond, Una O'Connor, George Cleveland, Charles Arnt and Claire Carleton. The picture also marked the debut of producer Adrian Scott, a communist who would later become a member of the Hollywood Ten.

Plot

A young girl named Gretchen befriends an AWOL army German Shepherd dog, naming him Wolf. When she takes Wolf home, her strict governess notifies the army, who comes to claim him. Wolf escapes from the army training camp and finds his way back to Gretchen. She and her friends travel to Washington to ask the Secretary of War for the dog, but to no avail. In the end, she is given a puppy to replace Wolf.

Cast
 Sharyn Moffett as Gretchen Anstey
 Jill Esmond as Miss Elizabeth Munn
 Una O'Connor as Mrs. Blevin
 George Cleveland as Wilson
 Charles Arnt as Papa Eisdaar
 Claire Carleton as Ruby
 Leona Maricle as Mrs. Priscilla Anstey
 Bruce Edwards as Mr. Paul Anstey
 Edward Fielding as Secretary of War
 Olga Fabian as Mama Eisdaar

References

External links 
 
 
 
 
 Film review at Variety

1944 films
American drama films
RKO Pictures films
Films directed by Alfred L. Werker
American black-and-white films
1944 drama films
1940s American films
1940s English-language films